Daniel Daejin Yoo (born July 4, 1962) is a retired U.S. Marine Corps major general and former commander of United States Marine Corps Forces Special Operations Command. He was the first Korean-American general in the history of the United States Marine Corps.

Education 
He graduated from Arizona State University in 1984 with a Bachelor of Science degree in Justice Studies. He is a graduate of the Naval War College, Army Ranger School and United States Army Airborne School.

Military career 
Yoo was commissioned in the United States Marine Corps as a Second Lieutenant in 1985 following completion of Officer Candidate School. Upon graduation from The Basic School and the Infantry Officers Course, Yoo reported to the 1st Marine Division, Camp Pendleton in 1986. He served with 2nd Battalion, 9th Marines as a rifle platoon commander, heavy machine gun platoon commander, weapons company executive officer and a rifle company commander. In 1989, Yoo received assignment to 3rd Reconnaissance Battalion, 3rd Marine Division in Okinawa, Japan. During this tour, he served as a Reconnaissance Platoon Commander and a Reconnaissance Company Commander. From 1992 to 1995 Yoo served as Inspector-Instructor, Detachment, 4th Force Reconnaissance Company, in Reno, Nevada followed by service Headquarters Marine Corps, Washington, DC from 1995 to 1998. In July 1998, Yoo attended the Naval Command and Staff College, Naval War College earning a Masters of Arts Degree in National Security and Strategic Studies in 1999. In August 1999, he was assigned to duty with the Current Operations Division, G3, II Marine Expeditionary Force and the 2nd Marine Expeditionary Brigade at Camp Lejeune. From March 2001 to 2002 Yoo was assigned as Operations Officer, 26th Marine Expeditionary Unit (Special Operations Capable) followed by command of Infantry Training Battalion, School of Infantry (East) from July 2002 to June 2004. He next was assigned to Director of Operations, J-3, Operations Directorate, Joint Staff, Washington, DC before commanding the 4th Marine Regiment, 3rd Marine Division from 2008 to 2010. He deployed in support of Operation Enduring Freedom as the Commander, Regional Corps Advisory Command Central 3-7, 201st Corps, Afghan National Army from July 2009 to April 2010. As a Brigadier General, Yoo was commanding general, I Marine Expeditionary Force (Forward).

He commanded the Marine Corps presence of 7,000 personnel in Helmand, southwest Afghanistan, in 2014, leading the International Security Assistance Force's Regional Command Southwest and Marine Expeditionary Brigade-Afghanistan. It was the final deployment of the MEP-Afghanistan. Yoo oversaw the handover of Helmand in October 2014 to Afghan National Army's 215th Corps, marking a transition in which the Marine Corps became a supporting force in the area rather than combat force. As a Major General, Yoo assumed duties as commanding officer of United States Marine Forces Special Operations Command from June 2018 to 26 June 2020.

Yoo relinquished command of MARSOC to Major General James F. Glynn.

Allegations of Misconduct 
While in command of MARSOC, Yoo was accused of misusing his position for financial gain. Yoo was also accused of ordering the courts martial of three MARSOC Marines to distract from his own alleged misconduct. One of the three Marines was granted immunity in exchange for his testimony against the other two. Despite this, both Marines who were court martialed were acquitted. Yoo was forced to retire early, on 26 June 2020.

Awards and decorations

References 

1962 births
Living people
American people of Korean descent
Arizona State University alumni
United States Marine Corps officers
Naval War College alumni
Recipients of the Legion of Merit
Recipients of the Defense Superior Service Medal
United States Marine Corps generals